Do is a surname of multiple origins.

Derivations
 Đỗ or Do, a Vietnamese surname
 Do, the romanization of the Korean surname  
 Do, Italian surname, from the Lombard name of Ono San Pietro

People
 Anh Do (born 1977), Vietnamese-Australian actor
 Cong Thanh Do (born 1959), Vietnamese American human rights activist
 Giovanni Do (c. 1617–c. 1656), Spanish painter
 Khoa Do (born 1979), Vietnamese-Australian actor
 Mattie Do, Lao film director
 Michelle Do (born 1983), American table tennis player
 Namkung Do (born 1982), South Korean football player
 Quinn Do (born 1975),  American poker player
 Tristan Do (born 1993), Thai football player 
 Yen Ngoc Do (1941–2006), Vietnamese-American newspaper publisher
 Do Dong-hyun (born 1993), South Korean footballer
 Do Hwa-Sung (born 1980), South Korean football player
 Do Ji-han (born 1991), South Korean actor
 Do Ji-won (born 1968), South Korean actress
 Do Jong-hwan (born 1955), South Korean poet and politician, Minister of Culture, Sports and Tourism as of 2017
 Do Kum-bong (1930–2009), South Korean actress
 Do Kyung-soo (born 1993), also known as D.O., South Korean singer and actor, member of EXO
 Do Han-se (born 1997), South Korean rapper and singer, member of Victon
 Do Mae Ni Ko (born 1993), Burmese volleyball player
 Do Sang-woo (born 1987), South Korean actor

Korean-language surnames
Vietnamese-language surnames